Engineering for Change (E4C) is an online platform and international community of engineers, scientists, non-governmental organizations, local community advocates and other innovators working to solve global development problems. The organization's founding partners are the American Society of Mechanical Engineers, the Institute of Electrical and Electronics Engineers, and Engineers Without Borders USA. It is now under the umbrella of ASME's Engineering for Global Development program. Collaborators include Siemens Stiftung, The Level Market, Autodesk Foundation, Global Alliance for Clean Cookstoves, CAWST, WFEO, ITU, Institute of Food Technologists, and United Nations Major Group for Children and Youth. E4C facilitates the development of affordable, locally appropriate and sustainable solutions to the most pressing humanitarian challenges and shares them freely online as a form of open source appropriate technology.

Members of the E4C community use the platform's online tools to share knowledge, research global development issues, products and services, and deepen their professional development. The organization provides services through seven channels:

The Solutions Library, a database of products that meet basic needs
Monthly webinars and academic seminars
Research Fellowship
News and analysis
Research in collaboration with external partners
Online courses in global development engineering and design
Jobs and volunteer opportunities board

Information about products and services fall into eight categories on the organization's Web site, and they can include big infrastructural projects such as community water purification and bridge building, or smaller, personal technologies such as bicycle-powered electricity generators and cellphone applications for healthcare.

History 
In 2009, the American Society of Mechanical Engineers created a website to pull together the disparate sources of information on appropriate technology and solutions in global development. The site aggregated information, hosted a library of often little-known technologies, and offered tools to enable collaboration among development teams worldwide. Throughout 2010, the site operated in alpha and then beta with a mostly closed group of users. A public site, at engineeringforchange.info, mirrored some of the content on the test site, but without all of its functionality. IEEE and EWB-USA signed on as partners in time for the public launch on January 4, 2011.

At present, the organization has more than 45,000 members and a social media following of more than one million.

Solutions Library 
The Solutions Library is a database of hundreds of products and services that meet basic needs in underserved communities. Entries are investigated and posted by the organization's staff and research fellows working remotely from home offices worldwide. The information on each entry is standardized to allow users to compare similar products to facilitate research and decision-making.

Education 
Education is an important part of Engineering for Change. The Web site provides educational materials on how to design and implement solutions, and an archive of relevant academic programs. Two free  teach principles of engineering for global development, and the website compiles academic programs, books and other professional development resources.

See also
 Appropriate technology
 Open source appropriate technology

References

External links 

 Official website
 "A Design Tool Whose Time Has Come" - NextBillion
 Innovative Banana Leaf Sanitary Pads Hit a Design Snag - Good.is

American engineering organizations
American Society of Mechanical Engineers
Appropriate technology organizations
Charities based in New York City
Development charities based in the United States
Engineering organizations
Engineers Without Borders
Institute of Electrical and Electronics Engineers
Mechanical engineering organizations
Organizations established in 2009